Onnarin Sattayabanphot (born 4 February 1984) is a Thai professional golfer playing on the LPGA of Japan Tour.

Professional career 
In 2009, Onnarin won the Thailand Ladies Open on the Ladies Asian Golf Tour.

Onnarin has played on the LPGA of Japan Tour since 2011 where she claim three titles. She got her maiden title in Japan at the Hoken No Madoguchi Ladies in 2013 before taking the Daikin Orchid Ladies Golf Tournament title the following year.

In 2014, she played in the Women's British Open but didn't make the cut. She represented Thailand in the International Crown team event.

In 2017, she claimed her third win on the LPGA of Japan Tour at the Golf5 Ladies in Chiba.

Professional wins (8)

LPGA of Japan Tour wins (3) 
2013 (1) Hoken No Madoguchi Ladies
2014 (1) Daikin Orchid Ladies Golf Tournament
2017 (1) Golf5 Ladies

Ladies Asian Golf Tour wins (1) 
2009 (1) Thailand Ladies Open

Futures Tour wins (1) 
2007 (1) ILOVENY Championship

JLPGA Step Up Tour wins (2) 
2010 (1) Sanyoshimbun Ladies Cup
2022 (1) Twin Fields Ladies Tournament

Thai LPGA Tour wins (1) 
2015 (1) 2nd Singha-SAT Thai LPGA Championship

References

External links

Onnarin Sattayabanphot
LPGA of Japan Tour golfers
Onnarin Sattayabanphot
Onnarin Sattayabanphot
Southeast Asian Games medalists in golf
Competitors at the 2001 Southeast Asian Games
1984 births
Living people
Onnarin Sattayabanphot